Anja Eline Skybakmoen (born 17 October 1984 in Trondheim, Norway) is a Norwegian jazz singer, composer and band leader, the younger sister of guitarist Jonas Skybakmoen, and married 31 July 2014, to the guitarist David Aleksander Sjølie.

Career 
Skybakmoen was educated at Norges Musikkhøgskole in Oslo.  She has sung in projects like Eplemøya Songlag and Aphrodisiac.  She replaced Tora Augestad in the vocal group Pitsj, and appeared on the album Gjenfortellinger (2009) together with the sisters Anine and Benedikte Kruse, and the twin sisters Ane Carmen and Ida Roggen. In 2013 she appeared for the first time with her own Anja Eline Skybakmoen Band including with Sebastian Haugen-Markussen (bass), Ivar Loe Bjørnstad (drums), David Aleksander Sjølie (guitar), Dag-Filip Roaldsnes (rhodes & synth) and Kim-Erik Pedersen (saxophon). She presented original material at Moldejazz and released her debut solo album We’re The Houses (2014).

Honors 

2012: Jazz Talent Award at the Moldejazz
2012: Geir Digernes Minnepris at the Trondheim Jazz Festival

Discography

Solo albums 

2014: We're The Houses (Øra Fonogram)
2015: Echo (Triogram)

Within Pitsj
2008: Edvard Grieg in Jazz Mood (Universal Music), with Kjell Karlsen ("I Dovregubbens hall")
2009: Gjenfortellinger (Grappa Music)
2014: Snow Is Falling (Grappa Music)

Within «Eplemöya Songlag»
2010: Eplemöya Songlag (NorCD)
2012: Möya Og Myten (NorCD)

EP
2012: Glorious People

Collaborations 

Within Johndoe
2000: Explosift! (D'sign Records)

Within Lumsk
2005: Troll (Tabu Recordings)

With «Northern Arc»
2012: Northern Arc (Curling Legs)

References

External links 

En sang til båtflyktningene (A song for the boat refugees)

Norwegian jazz composers
Norwegian women jazz singers
Norwegian Academy of Music alumni
Musicians from Trondheim
1978 births
Living people
20th-century Norwegian women singers
20th-century Norwegian singers
21st-century Norwegian women singers
21st-century Norwegian singers
Pitsj members